Thunderfingers: The Best of John Entwistle is a compilation album by John Entwistle, who was the bassist for The Who. The album was released in 1996 by Rhino Records. It was Entwistle's only record to be released by that company.

When Allmusic rated the album they said: "As a solo artist separate from the Who, John Entwistle has never been more than a cult figure. His solo music rocks harder than Pete Townshend's, and, at least initially, what he lacked as a singer he more than makes up for in the sheer weirdness of his lyrics. This 18-song collection may make a few converts, showcasing the best songs from five albums cut between 1971 through 1981."

Track listings
All songs written by John Entwistle except those noted

References 

1996 compilation albums
John Entwistle compilation albums